Trilok (Jainism), a division of the universe into heavenly, earthly and infernal regions
 Trilok Teerth Dham, a Jain temple in Bada Gaon, Baghpat, Uttar Pradesh
 Trailokya, a division of the universe into three regions or states of existence in Hindu and Buddhist theology, and in theosophism; also a surname
 Trilok Gurtu (born 1951), Indian percussionist and composer
 Trilok Kapoor (active 1933-1954), Indian film actor
 Zamindaar Babu Trilok Nath (1866-1960), ruler of the princely state of Belghat, Northwest Province, British India (modern day Uttar Pradesh)

See also
 

Indian given names